Lophopetalum sessilifolium is a species of plant in the family Celastraceae. It is a tree endemic to Borneo where it is confined to Sarawak.

References

sessilifolium
Endemic flora of Borneo
Flora of Sarawak
Trees of Borneo
Vulnerable flora of Asia
Taxonomy articles created by Polbot